Kimberly A. Stratton (born November 7, 1961) is an American gospel musician. Her first album, I'm in This Place, was released by Glorious Music in 1994, and this was a Billboard magazine breakthrough release upon the Gospel Albums chart. She released, Live in Chicago with the A.F.C. Choir, with Glorious Records in 1995. The third album, Almost Forgot to Worship, was released in 2007 with Kingdom Records.

Early life
Stratton was born on November 7, 1961, and she is based out of Chicago, Illinois.

Music career
Her music recording career commenced in 1994, with the album, I'm in This Pace, and it was released by Glorious Music on July 11, 1994, and this was her breakthrough release upon the Billboard magazine Gospel Albums chart at No. 18. She released, Live in Chicago with the A.F.C. Choir, in 1995 with Glorious Music. The subsequent album, Almost Forgot to Worship, was released on August 28, 1997 by Kingdom Music.

Discography

References

External links
 Cross Rhythms artist profile

1961 births
Living people
African-American songwriters
African-American Christians
Musicians from Chicago
Songwriters from Illinois
21st-century African-American people
20th-century African-American people